François Elichagaray (born 3 September 1895, date of death unknown) was a French rowing coxswain. He competed in three events at the 1912 Summer Olympics.

References

1895 births
Year of death missing
French male rowers
Olympic rowers of France
Rowers at the 1912 Summer Olympics
Sportspeople from Bayonne
Coxswains (rowing)